Fateless or Fatelessness is a novel by Imre Kertész, winner of the 2002 Nobel Prize for literature, written between 1960 and 1973 and first published in 1975.

The novel is a semi-autobiographical story about a 14-year-old Hungarian Jew's experiences in the Auschwitz and Buchenwald concentration camps. The book is the first part of a trilogy, which continues in A kudarc ("Fiasco" ) and Kaddis a meg nem született gyermekért ("Kaddish for an Unborn Child" ).

Kertész won the Nobel Prize for Literature in 2002, "for writing that upholds the fragile experience of the individual against the barbaric arbitrariness of history".

The book was first translated into English by Christopher C. Wilson and Katharina M. Wilson in 1992 as Fateless ( and ), while in 2004 a second translation by Tim Wilkinson appeared under the title Fatelessness. In the UK edition, Wilkinson's translation  retained the title Fatelessness.

Plot summary 

The novel is about a young Hungarian boy, György "Gyuri" Köves, living in Budapest. The book opens as György's father is being sent to a labor camp. Soon afterwards, György receives working papers and travels to work outside of the Jewish quarter. One day all of the Jews are pulled off of the buses leaving the Jewish quarter, and are sent to Auschwitz on a train without water. Arriving there, György lies about his age, unknowingly saving his own life, and tells us of camp life and the conditions he faces.

Eventually he is sent to Buchenwald, and  continues on describing his life in a concentration camp, before being finally sent to another camp in Zeitz. György falls ill and nears death, but remains alive and is eventually sent to a hospital facility in a concentration camp until the war ends. Returning to Budapest, he is confronted with those who were not sent to camps and had just recently begun to hear of the terrible injustice and suffering.

Analysis 

A parallel can be drawn between Fatelessness and Franz Kafka's The Trial. Both novels portray the descent of an innocent protagonist into the madness of a system in which he is caught and György's rationalizations for the events that occur around him bear a resemblance to the eventual acceptance by The Trial protagonist Josef K. of his own fate.

Movie 

A movie version, with screenplay by Imre Kertész, was released in 2005, made in Hungary by director Lajos Koltai, with Marcell Nagy in the starring role. It also features British actor Daniel Craig, who plays a cameo as an American Army Sergeant.

References 

1975 novels
Hungarian novels
Autobiographical novels
Novels about the Holocaust
Personal accounts of the Holocaust
Hungarian novels adapted into films
Novels set in Budapest
Magvető books